Joanne van Lieshout (born 8 November 2002) is a Dutch judoka.

She is the gold medallist of the 2022 Judo Grand Prix Almada in the -63 kg category.

References

External links
 
 
 

2002 births
Living people
Dutch female judoka
21st-century Dutch women